The Sierra Nevada antpitta (Grallaria spatiator) is a species of bird in the family Grallariidae. It is endemic to the Sierra Nevada de Santa Marta in northern Colombia. It is a member of the rufous antpitta species complex and was recently elevated from subspecies to species based on differences in plumage and vocalizations and genetic evidence.

Taxonomy 
The Sierra Nevada antpitta was described as a subspecies of rufous antpitta in 1898, but in 2020 was elevated to species on the basis of its reddish-yellow-brown plumage, its faster vocalizations, and significant mitochondrial genetic differences.

The Sierra Nevada antpitta gets its common name from the mountain range in which it lives, the Sierra Nevada de Santa Marta. The specific name spatiator comes from the Latin for "pedestrian".

Distribution and habitat 
It is endemic to the Sierra Nevada de Santa Marta in northern Colombia in the departments of Magdalena, La Guajira and Cesar. It is found at elevations of 2,200–2,900 m. They inhabit humid montane forests and forest edges. 

It is separated from the closely related Perijá antpitta by the Cesar depression separating the Santa Maria range from the Serranía del Perijá.

References 

Grallaria
Birds of Colombia
Endemic fauna of Colombia